Tigran Gevorki Chukhajian (1837 – March 11, 1898) was an Ottoman Armenian composer and conductor, and the founder of the first opera institution in the Ottoman Empire.

Biography 

Chukhajian was born in Constantinople. He studied at composer Gabriel Yeranian's class, then had classes in Milan. Along with other Armenian intellectuals of that period he fought for the development of national culture, organized Armenian musical societies, theatres, schools, papers and free concerts.  In 1862, he took over publication of the Armenian musical journal Armenian Lyre.In his works, Chukhajian used the elements of European musical techniques and eastern music elements He is an author of pieces for piano, songs and romances, chamber and symphonic works, operas. His most successful opera was Leblebici hor-hor agha (1875), it was premiered at the French Theatre in Constantinople, it was so successful that during the season it was performed more than hundred times and during the month Ramadan it was performed every single night (Zemire, 1890) etc. He died in Smyrna (now İzmir). Chukhajian is buried in the Armenian cemetery of İzmir.

He created the first Armenian opera, Arshak II (1868, partially staged in 1873), based on the historical figure King Arsaces II (Arshak II).Arshak II was banned because of its potential political ramifications. Nevertheless, Chukhajian changed some of the scenes and managed to convince Naum to allow the opera to be performed in his theatre by an Italian opera group known as Olimpia. The score was considered lost, but was discovered in 1942 and performed in 1945 in a revised version at the Armenian Opera Theater opera theater in Yerevan. Arshak II continued in the repertoire of the Yerevan Opera Theater. In 2001, it was staged at the San Francisco Opera.

Chukhajian is also remembered as the composer of what may have been the first original opera in Turkish, Arif'in Hilesi (Arif's Deception), based on Nikolai Gogol's The Government Inspector .The opera caused a conflict between Chouhajian and Gullu Agop whether it was a vaudeville or opera. It was performed in the Gedikpaşa theatre.

Selected compositions

Operas 
 Arshak II (opera) (1868)
 Arif'in Hilesi (1874)
 Leblebidji Hor-Hor Agha (1875)
 Zemire (1890)
 Indiana (1897)

Solo Piano Works 
 Mouvement Perpetuel
 Cascade de couz
 Illusion
 Apres La Gavotte
 Deux Fantaisies Orientales
 La Lyre Orientale, Laura
 Rapelle-tois
 Romans
 Impromptu in B Flat Minor ‘Cascade De Couz’ (1887)
 Danse Caractéristique in a minor ‘L’orientale’ (1891)
 Grande Valse Fantastique in a minor ‘Illusions’ (1888)
 Tarantelle in b-flat minor (1887)
 Caprice in e minor ‘La Lyre Orientale’ (1894)
 Mazurka De Salon ‘Mignon’ (1887)
 Une Gavotte De Plus in E-flat Major (1883)
 Polka in F Major ‘La Gaité’ (1892)
 Proti Polka in G Major (1892)
 Funeral March in d minor (1884)
 Fantaisie Orientale No. 1 in A Minor ‘Sur des Motifs Turcs’ (1895)
 Fantaisie Orientale No. 2 in A Minor ‘Sur des Motifs Turcs’ (1895)

References

Bibliography 
 
 Karadagli, Ozgecan. “From Empire to Republic: Western Art Music, Nationalism, and the Merging Mediation of Saygun’s Op.26 Yunus Emre Oratorio.” University of Alberta Libraries, 2017. https://doi.org/10.7939/R3FQ9QK4S.
 Karadagli, Ozgecan. 2003. “Türkiye’ye Müzikli Sahne Sanatlarının Girisi Dikran Çuhacıyan Öncesi ve Sonrasi. Istanbul: Unpublished Master's Thesis.
 Karadagli, O. (2020). Western Performing Arts in the Late Ottoman Empire: Accommodation and Formation. Context, 46, 17-33.

Further reading
 Nikoghos Tahmizian, The Life and Work of Dikran Tchouhadjian, trans. Aris Sevag, Pasadena, CA: Drazark Publishing, 2001. (translated from "Dikran Tchouhadjian: gyanku yev steghtazakortzoutiunu," 1999)
 Ozgecan Karadagli, Western Performing Arts in the Late Ottoman Empire: Accommodation and Formation ,''

External links 

Chukhajian – Arsaces II – Aram Katanyan (recording of the opera)
In the Footsteps of Tchouhadjian — documentary film about Chukhajian

1837 births
1898 deaths
19th-century classical composers
19th-century conductors (music)
Armenian conductors (music)
Armenian opera composers
Armenians from the Ottoman Empire
Composers from the Ottoman Empire
Ethnic Armenian composers
Male opera composers
Musicians from Istanbul
Opera in Turkey
Romantic composers
19th-century male musicians
19th-century musicians